Agnieszka Krukówna (born 20 March 1971, Chorzów) is a Polish film, television and theatre actress. She is a laureate of the Polish Film Award for Best Actress for her role a 1998 film Farba.

Life and career
She was born on 20 March 1971 in Chorzów. In 1983, at the age of 12, she made her film debut by appearing in Wojciech Sawa's film Panny. In 1995, she graduated from the National Academy of Dramatic Art in Warsaw. During her studies she starred in such films as Steven Spielberg's 1993 historical drama Schindler's List, Jerzy Antczak's 1994 film Dama kameliowa and Radosław Piwowarski's film Kolejność uczuć. She worked at the Powszechny Theatre in Warsaw. In 1999, she was awarded the Polish Film Award for best actress for her role in Michał Rosa's film Farba. She also gained great popularity by playing the main protagonist of a teen drama TV series Janka.

Filmography
1984: Panny as Iwonka
1985: Urwisy z Doliny Młynów as jako Asia
1986: Klementynka i Klemens as jako Asia
1987: Ucieczka z miejsc ukochanych as Hela (episodes 2 and 3)
1989: Janka as Janka Nowak
1990: Kramarz as daughter
1990: Korczak as Ewa
1990: W piątą stronę świata as Dorota
1990: Życie za życie. Maksymilian Kolbe as Konior's daughter
1990: Janka as Janka Nowak
1992: Szwadron as Weronka
1993: Schindler's List as Czurda's girlfriend
1993: Kolejność uczuć as the director's wife
1994: Dama kameliowa as Nanine
1995: Pestka as Sabina
1997: Farba as Farba
1997: Łóżko Wierszynina as Irina
1997: Boża podszewka as Maryśka Jurewicz
1997: Czas zdrady as Rosana
1999: With Fire and Sword as a young Ukrainian girl
1999: Fuks as Sonia
2003: Na dobre i na złe as Grażyna Małecka (episodes 132-134)
2003: Męskie-żeńskie as Hania (episode 2)
2003-2004: Na Wspólnej as Iwona Gładczyńska
2003: Defekt as Ewa Bauman
2004: Kosmici as Lucy Majewska
2005: Rozdroże Cafe as Katarzyna
2005: Klinika samotnych serc as Joanna Kawecka (episodes 1, 2 and 9)
2006: Niania as Aśka Nowaczyńska (episode 45)
2011: Rezydencja as Oracja Modzelewska
2013: Psubrat as mother
2014: Na dobre i na złe as Marzena Konopka (episode 559)
2020: 25 lat niewinności. Sprawa Tomka Komendy

See also
Polish cinema
Polish Film Awards

References

1971 births
Living people
Polish actresses
People from Chorzów